Kamal Ahmed (born 1966), usually called Kamal, is a Trinidadian-Bangladeshi American comedian and former member of prank phone calling comedy group The Jerky Boys.

Early life and career
Kamal was born in East New York, Brooklyn and raised in Astoria, Queens & the Lower East Side of Manhattan. His father, Manir Ahmed, a former chemical engineer, started the restaurant "Shah Bagh" in the East Village.  This eventually led him to owning a string of Indian restaurants in an area that became "Little India". Kamal's mother, who was from Trinidad & Tobago worked for the United Nations. Ahmed's sister is also a chemical engineer that has worked for major pharmaceutical companies. Kamal took an early interest in music and has become an accomplished bass guitar player and scores many of his productions.

 

Ahmed was a founding member of the jerky boys and co-starred with John G. Brennan in the Touchstone comedy film The Jerky Boys: The Movie in 1995.  He played Kissel, a World War II veteran; Tarbash the Egyptian Magician; Curly G. Cradle-Rock, and other characters on the Jerky Boys albums. Kamal appeared in "Punch", a 1994 episode of Space Ghost Coast to Coast. Tensions began to develop between Brennan and Ahmed while shooting the Jerky Boys film and their collaboration deteriorated further during the production of Big Money Hustlas, where Ahmed appeared in a cameo.

In 2000, Ahmed released a solo album, Once a Jerk, Always a Jerk. Kamal has made multiple television and radio appearances on Late Night with David Letterman, Late Night with Conan O'Brien and The Howard Stern Show. He has acted in, and directed several films, including LAUGH KILLER LAUGH, completed in 2015. and in 2022, Kamal released his first mini-series, Crash the System, which was distributed on steaming media platforms worldwide.

Filmography 
, Ahmed has directed 6 full-length films and 1 TV mini series.

References

External links

1966 births
Living people
American people of Bangladeshi descent
American people of Trinidad and Tobago descent
American male comedians
Place of birth missing (living people)
Prank calling
Comedians from New York City
21st-century American comedians